Energy Conversion and Management is a biweekly peer-reviewed scientific journal covering research on energy generation, utilization, conversion, storage, transmission, conservation, management, and sustainability that was established in 1979. It is published by Elsevier and the editor-in-chief is Moh'd Ahmad Al-Nimr (Jordan University of Science and Technology).

Abstracting and indexing
The journal is abstracted and indexed in Current Contents/Engineering, Computing & Technology, Science Citation Index Expanded, and Scopus. According to the Journal Citation Reports, the journal has a 2021 impact factor of 11.533.

References

External links

Elsevier academic journals
Publications established in 1979
English-language journals
Energy and fuel journals
Biweekly journals